The 2019 MLS Re-Entry Draft took place on November 26, 2019 (Stage 1) and December 3, 2019 (Stage 2). All 26 Major League Soccer clubs were eligible to participate. The priority order for the MLS Re-Entry Draft was reverse order of finish in 2019, taking into account playoff performance. The 2020 expansion teams, Nashville SC and Inter Miami CF, received selections #25 and #26, respectively.

Available to all teams in Stage 1 of the Re-Entry draft were:
 Players who were at least 23 years old and had a minimum of three years of MLS experience whose contract options were not exercised by their clubs. They were available at their option salary for 2020.
 Players who were at least 25 years old with a minimum of four years of MLS experience who are out of contract and whose club did not wish to re-sign them at their previous salary. They were available for at least their 2019 salary.
 Free Agents that chose to participate.

Players who were not selected in Stage 1 of the Re-Entry Draft were made available in Stage 2. Clubs selecting players in Stage 2 were able to negotiate a new salary with the player. If a selected player was not under contract, the selecting club was required to make a genuine offer to the player within seven days subject to League Office approval.

Players who were unselected after Stage 2 were made available to any MLS club on a first-come, first-served basis.

Teams also had the option of passing on their selection.

Available players
Players were required to meet age and service requirements to participate as stipulated by the terms of the MLS Collective Bargaining Agreement. The league released a list of all players available for the Re-Entry Draft on November 22, 2019. Subsequently, the league released a list of all players available for Stage Two of the Re-Entry Draft on December 2, 2019.

Stage One
The first stage of the 2019 MLS Re-Entry Draft took place on November 26, 2019.

Round 1

Round 2

Stage One trades

Stage Two
The second stage of the 2019 MLS Re-Entry Draft took place on December 3, 2019.

Round 1

Round 2

References 

Major League Soccer drafts
Mls Re-entry Draft, 2019
MLS Re-Entry Draft